Mak Million is the debut album of Haystak, released on Street Flava Records.

Mak Million
 "Intro" - 0:54
 "Go 2 War" - 3:41
 "Flossin'" (featuring Pistol) - 3:54
 "Came Along Way" - 4:31
 "Down Yonder" - 4:23
 "Yeah" - 4:56
 "M-O-N-E-Y" - 4:19
 "So Dope" - 5:12
 "S.S. Big Pimp" - 4:35
 "Don't Want It" - 4:21
 "Ballin'" - 5:41
 "Desperado" - 4:15
 "Worldwide" - 4:19
 "A Self-Made Man" - 4:21
 "Strugglin' Strivin'" - 5:10

Haystak albums
1998 debut albums